The Shoreline Unified School District serves the West Marin and Sonoma County communities stretching from the towns of Point Reyes Station and Inverness along Tomales Bay running north past the fishing port of Bodega Bay to the mouth of the Russian River, a distance of nearly 50 miles (80 km) and widens 13 miles (21 km) east from the west coast. Shoreline Unified draws its students from approximately 450 square miles (1,200 km2).

Schools
Bodega Bay School
Inverness Primary
Tomales Elementary School
Tomales High School
West Marin School

Communities served
Marin County
Point Reyes Station
Inverness
Olema
Marshall
Tomales
Dillon Beach

Sonoma County
Valley Ford
Bloomfield
Bodega
Bodega Bay
Western Petaluma

References

External links
 Shoreline Unified School District

School districts in Marin County, California
School districts in Sonoma County, California